Aberllefenni is a village in the south of Gwynedd, Wales. It lies in the historic county of Merionethshire/Sir Feirionnydd, in the valley of the Afon Dulas, and in the Community of Corris.

Government 
The village has a community council. The current representatives are elected residents and the local councillor who often attends is John Pughe Roberts. 
The community council system replaced the old parish council system and tackles local issues, acts as a contact point between local government and residents for information and resource on many environmental, equality, ethnicity and gender issues and other problems.

References 

Community Council

 
Villages in Gwynedd
Corris